Infanta Maria Antónia of Portugal (Portuguese: Maria Antónia Adelaide Camila Carolina Eulália Leopoldina Sofia Inês Francisca de Assis e de Paula Micaela Rafaela Gabriela Gonzaga Gregória Bernardina Benedita Andrea; 28 November 1862 – 14 May 1959) was the seventh and last child of Miguel of Portugal and Adelaide of Löwenstein-Wertheim-Rosenberg.

Early life 

She was born in exile as the youngest child of her parents in Germany as her father, Infante Miguel, had been banished from Portugal by his brother, Pedro I of Brazil, after usurping and losing the Portuguese throne in the Liberal Wars.

Marriage

On 15 October 1884 at Schloss Fischorn, Maria Antonia married Robert I, Duke of Parma as his second wife. She bore him twelve children. Maria Antonia was widowed when Robert died at Villa Pianore on 16 November 1907.  Later on she resided with her daughter Zita while in exile. By 1940, Zita and her family, Maria Antonia and her daughter Isabella were living in reduced circumstances in Quebec. Eventually, after the War's end, Maria Antonia moved to Berg Castle, Luxembourg where she celebrated her 90th birthday. After lingering for many years, she died there in 1959 aged 96. She was the last surviving grandchild of John VI of Portugal. Many of her children and grandchildren have also lived very long lives.

Issue
Princess Maria della Neve Adelaide (5 August 1885 – 6 February 1959); she was a Benedictine nun and her religious name of Mother Maria Benedicta of the Benedictine Order of the Sisters of St. Cecile.
Prince Sixtus of Bourbon-Parma (1 August 1886 – 14 March 1934); he married Hedwige de La Rochefoucauld on 12 November 1919. They have one daughter, five grandsons, six great-grandchildren and one great-great-granddaughter.
Xavier, Duke of Parma (25 May 1889 – 7 May 1977); he married Madeleine de Bourbon-Busset on 12 November 1927. They have six children, eight grandchildren and ten great-grandchildren.
Princess Francesca of Bourbon-Parma (22 April 1890 – 7 October 1978)
Zita of Bourbon-Parma (9 May 1892 – 14 March 1989); she married Charles I of Austria on 21 October 1911. They have eight children, thirty-three grandchildren, one hundred and ten great-grandchildren and thirty-one great-great-grandchildren.
Prince Felix of Bourbon-Parma (28 September 1893 – 8 April 1970); he married Charlotte of Luxembourg on 6 November 1919. They have six children, twenty-seven grandchildren, seventy-eight great-grandchildren and twenty-seven great-great-grandchildren.
Prince René of Bourbon-Parma (17 October 1894 – 30 July 1962); he married Princess Margrethe of Denmark on 9 June 1921. They have four children, seventeen grandchildren, twenty-seven great-grandchildren and twelve great-great-grandchildren.
Princess Maria Antonia of Bourbon-Parma (7 November 1895 – 19 October 1977)
Princess Isabella of Bourbon-Parma (14 June 1898 – 28 July 1984) 
Prince Louis of Bourbon-Parma (5 December 1899 – 4 December 1967); he married Princess Maria Francesca of Savoy on 23 January 1939. They have four children, seven grandchildren and five great-grandchildren. 
Princess Henrietta Anna of Bourbon-Parma (8 March 1903 – 13 June 1987); she was profoundly deaf.
Prince Gaetano of Bourbon-Parma (11 June 1905 – 9 March 1958); he married Princess Margherita della Torre e Tasso (1909-2006) on 29 April 1931 and they were divorced on 24 January 1950. They have one daughter, three grandchildren and two great-grandsons:
Princess Diane Marguerite of Bourbon-Parma (22 May 1932 – 7 May 2020); she married Prince Franz Joseph of Hohenzollern-Sigmaringen on 15 March 1955 and they were divorced on 19 January 1961. She remarried Hans Joachim Oehmichen on 21 March 1961. Victim of COVID-19. They have three children and two grandsons:
Alexander Oehmichen (b. 2 June 1957); he married Jutta Raiss in 1998. They have one son:
Philip Oehmichen (b. 2002) 
Gaetano Oehmichen (b. 1961); he married Julika Reich in 1995
Robert Oehmichen (b. 2001) 
Maria Oehmichen (b. 1964)

Ancestry

See also
Descendants of Miguel I of Portugal

References

|-
  

1862 births
1959 deaths
House of Braganza
Princesses of Bourbon-Parma
Portuguese infantas
Duchesses of Parma
Dames of the Order of Saint Isabel
People from Wertheim am Main
19th-century Portuguese people
20th-century Portuguese people
19th-century Portuguese women
20th-century Portuguese women
Daughters of kings